The Wisconsin Department of Corrections (WIDOC) is an administrative department in the executive branch of the state of Wisconsin responsible for corrections in Wisconsin, including state prisons and community supervision. The secretary is a cabinet member appointed by the governor of Wisconsin and confirmed by the Wisconsin Senate.

Divisions of the Wisconsin Department of Corrections include: the Division of Juvenile Corrections (DJC), the Division of Adult Institutions (DAI), the Division of Community Corrections (DCC) and Division of Management Services (DMS). WIDOC is headquartered in Madison.

History
The first prison under the jurisdiction of the Wisconsin Department of Corrections opened in 1851 in Waupun. In 1853, Wisconsin permanently abolished the death penalty, making it the first state to do so. In 1909, a law was enacted creating parole and the state's first Parole officer was appointed. In 1933, Taycheedah Correctional Institution opened as an all female prison.

In June 2008, over 120 minimum-security supervised inmate workers were used to assist in filling sandbags and flood cleanup during the flooding.

In April 2020, the American Civil Liberties Union filed a lawsuit asking the Wisconsin Supreme Court to order Governor Tony Evers and the Department of Corrections to reduce the prison population due to COVID-19.

Division of Adult Institutions 
The Division of Adult Institutions (DAI) oversees 19 adult institutions and 16 adult correctional centers, along with the Office of Program Services, the Bureau of Correctional Enterprises, the Bureau of Health Services and the Bureau of Offender Classification and Movement. The Wisconsin Correctional Center System consists of 14 adult male facilities statewide that assist inmates in reintegration to the community. The Wisconsin Women's Correctional System includes Taycheedah Correctional Institution and two adult female correctional centers.

Male inmates entering the prison system first go to Dodge Correctional Institution before being given permanent assignments, and female inmates to Taycheedah Correctional Institution.

Division of Juvenile Corrections 
The Division of Juvenile Corrections operates three juvenile facilities and several regional offices in the Northwest and Southeast.

Secured juvenile correctional facilities include:
Lincoln Hills School and Copper Lake School are located in Irma, WI.
The Grow Academy is a residential program offering comprehensive treatment for county and state-supervised youth as an alternative to incarceration, as well as a step down for youth returning to the community.

The state also uses residential care centers and works with the Department of Health Services in relation to the Mendota Juvenile Treatment Center (MJTC).

Facilities that are now closed include:
 Ethan Allen School for Boys (Delafield) - Closed on July 1, 2011.
 Facility was converted from the Wisconsin State TB Sanitarium to a juvenile facility in April 1959.
 Southern Oaks Girls School - Closed on July 1, 2011.

Division of Community Corrections 
The function of the Division of Community Corrections (DCC) is to supervise offenders (more than 68,000 as of 2017) on probation, parole or extended supervision, which includes the operation and maintenance of the Wisconsin sex offender registry program.  These offenders are supervised by Probation and Parole Agents who use evidence based-practices to enhance public safety by addressing their offender's most influential criminogenic needs to lower their level of recidivism and assist them in building skills needed to be successful in the community. Agents provide investigative services to the courts and the Parole Commission to aid in sentencing and community reentry planning.

On August 24, 2020, a Division of Community Corrections building was burned down during the Kenosha unrest.  This office was responsible for the supervision of sexual offenders in Kenosha.

Division of Management Services
The Division of Management Services (DMS) provides analytical and operational services that support all Department of Corrections' policies, programs, and service delivery initiatives. The Division serves as a resource in the areas of training, risk management and safety, fleet management, budgeting, internal auditing, accounting, fiscal services, food services, purchasing and procurement, facilities management, telecommunications, general support services, information systems, technology management, and records management.

Facilities 

The Wisconsin Department of Corrections operates 20 prisons.

Fallen officers 

Since the establishment of the Wisconsin Department of Corrections, Two officers have died in the line of duty.

Historical leadership

State Prison Commissioners (1853–1874)

See also 
List of United States state correction agencies
List of law enforcement agencies in Wisconsin
List of Wisconsin state prisons
Wisconsin witch hunt

References

External links 
 Wisconsin Department of Corrections official website

Prisons in Wisconsin
State corrections departments of the United States
Juvenile detention centers in the United States
1851 establishments in Wisconsin
Government agencies established in 1851